This is a summary of 2011 in music in the United Kingdom.

Events
1 January – Musicians honoured in the Queen's New Year Honours list include mezzo-soprano Felicity Palmer (CBE) and composer Howard Goodall (CBE), Richard Thompson (OBE) and Annie Lennox (OBE).
14 April – On his sixtieth birthday, Julian Lloyd Webber gives the première of American composer Eric Whitacre's "The River Cam", written specially for the occasion.
29 April – The wedding of Prince William and Catherine Middleton includes original music by Paul Mealor and John Rutter as well as traditional works by British composers such as Hubert Parry's setting of the anthem "I was glad" and William Walton's "Crown Imperial".
10–12 June – The Download Festival 2011 takes place at Donington Park. The main stage is headlined by Def Leppard, System of a Down and Linkin Park, the second stage by Pendulum, Alice Cooper and Rob Zombie, the Pepsi Max stage by Danzig, Funeral for a Friend and Frank Turner, the Red Bull Bedroom Jam stage by Modestep, Dangerous! and H.E.A.T., and the Jägermeister Acoustic stage by Skindred, Bowling for Soup and Dave McPherson.
11 June – Musicians honoured in the Queen's Birthday Honours list include Bryan Ferry (CBE), broadcaster Bob Harris (OBE) and jazz singer Claire Martin (OBE).
10 September – Edward Gardner conducted the Last Night of the Proms for the first time.  The programme included works by Béla Bartók and Franz Liszt as well as the traditional Elgar, and the soloist for "Rule Britannia" was Susan Bullock.  A highlight was the première of Peter Maxwell Davies's Musica benevolens.
9 October – Sir Paul McCartney marries Nancy Shevell. 
18 October – Ian Brown, John Squire, Mani & Reni announce the reformation of The Stone Roses at London's Soho Hotel.
11 December – Little Mix emerge winners of the 2011 X Factor series.  They are the first group entry to win in the programme's eight-year history. Marcus Collins is named runner-up, while Amelia Lily and Misha B finish in third and fourth place respectively.

Publications
Ian Bostridge – A Singer's Notebook

Classical music

New works
Karl Jenkins – The Bards of Wales (cantata)
Paul Mealor – Ubi Caritas et Amor
Graham Waterhouse – Rhapsodie Macabre
Eric Whitacre – The River Cam

Opera
Peter Maxwell Davies – Kommilitonen!
Jonathan Dove – Mansfield Park
Mark-Anthony Turnage – Anna Nicole

Albums
Nicola Benedetti – Italia
Alfie Boe – Alfie
Bond – Play
Katherine Jenkins – Daydream
Paul Lewis – Schubert: Piano Sonatas
Julian Lloyd Webber – The Art of Julian Lloyd Webber (compilation)

Field recordings
Chris Watson – El Tren Fantasma

Film and incidental music
Lorne Balfe – Ironclad
Neil Brand – Underground
Jonny Greenwood – We Need to Talk About Kevin

British music awards

BRIT Awards
The 2011 BRIT Awards were hosted by James Corden on 15 February 2011. The most notable winners were Tinie Tempah and Arcade Fire, both winning two awards.

British Male Solo Artist: Plan B
British Female Solo Artist: Laura Marling
British Breakthrough Act: Tinie Tempah
British Group: Take That
MasterCard British Album: Sigh No More – Mumford & Sons
British Single: "Pass Out" – Tinie Tempah
International Male Solo Artist: Cee Lo Green
International Female Solo Artist: Rihanna
International Breakthrough Act: Justin Bieber
International Group: Arcade Fire
International Album: The Suburbs – Arcade Fire
British Producer: Markus Dravs
Critics' Choice: Jessie J

Classical BRIT Awards
The 2011 Classical BRIT Awards were held on 12 May 2011 at the Royal Albert Hall, London and hosted by Myleene Klass.

Male Artist of the Year: Antonio Pappano
Female Artist of the Year: Alison Balsom
Newcomer Award: Vilde Frang
Composer of the Year: Arvo Pärt
Critics' Award: Tasmin Little
Artist of the Decade: Il Divo
Album of the Year: Moonlight Serenade – André Rieu and His Johann Strauss Orchestra
Outstanding Contribution to Music: John Barry (posthumous)

Ivor Novello Awards
The 56th Ivor Novello Awards were held on 19 May 2011 at the Grosvenor House Hotel, London.

 Best Song Musically and Lyrically: "Becoming a Jackal" – Villagers (written by Conor O'Brien)
 Best Contemporary Song: "Pass Out" – Tinie Tempah (written by Timothy McKenzie, Patrick Okogwu and Marc Williams)
 Album Award: The Defamation of Strickland Banks – Plan B
 Best Original Film Score: How to Train Your Dragon (composed by John Powell)
 Best Original Video Game Score: Napoleon: Total War (composed by Richard Beddow, Richard Birdsall and Ian Livingstone)
 Best Television Soundtrack: Any Human Heart (composed by Dan Jones)
 Songwriter of the Year: Benjamin Drew
 Most Performed Work: "She Said" – Plan B (written by Eric Appapoulay, Richard Cassell, Benjamin Drew and Tom Wright-Goss)
 Classical Music Award: Michael Nyman
 Inspiration Award: Dizzee Rascal
 Outstanding Song Collection: Steve Winwood
 Outstanding Contribution to British Music: Paul Rodgers
 International Achievement: Matthew Bellamy, Dominic Howard & Christopher Wolstenholme (Muse)
 Special International Award: Stephen Sondheim

Mercury Prize
The 2011 Barclaycard Mercury Prize was awarded on 6 September 2011 to PJ Harvey for her album Let England Shake. Harvey became the first artist to win the Mercury Prize twice.

Popjustice £20 Music Prize
The 2011 Popjustice £20 Music Prize was awarded on 6 September 2011 to The Saturdays for their song "Higher".

British Composer Awards
The 2011 British Composer Awards were held on 30 November 2011 at Stationers' Hall, London and hosted by BBC Radio 3 presenters Sara Mohr-Pietsch and Andrew McGregor, with the awards presented by Michael Berkeley. There was no award in the Sonic Art category in 2011.

Instrumental Solo or Duo: Sonata for Cello & Piano – William Sweeney
Chamber: String Quartet No. 2 – Anthony Payne
Vocal: Five Larkin Songs – Huw Watkins
Choral: Allele – Michael Zev Gordon
Wind Band or Brass Band: In Pitch Black – Lucy Pankhurst
Orchestral: Fantasias – Julian Anderson
Stage Works: A Ring A Lamp A Thing – Orlando Gough
Liturgical: Bell Mass – Julian Anderson
Contemporary Jazz Composition: The Green Seagull – Tommy Evans
Community or Educational Project: Consider the Lilies – John Barber
Making Music Award: I can't find brumm... – Richard Bullen
International Award: La Mattina – Bent Sørensen
Outreach: PK – Graham Fitkin

The Record of the Year
The 2011 Record of the Year was awarded on 10 December 2011 to Lady Gaga for her song "Born This Way".

Charts and sales

Number-one singles

Number-one albums

Number-one compilation albums

Best-selling singles of 2011

Best-selling albums of 2011

Notes:

Platinum records
For a record to be certified platinum, it must sell a minimum of 600,000 copies. However, not every song that sells 600,000 copies is given platinum certification and so this is not a complete list of songs that have sold 600,000 copies in 2011. Also note that a song certified platinum could have sold its 600,000th copy long before it is given certification.

Deaths
4 January
Mick Karn – English multi-instrumentalist musician and songwriter, 52
Gerry Rafferty – Scottish singer-songwriter, 63
14 January – Trish Keenan, singer (Broadcast), 42 (swine flu).
16 January – Steve Prestwich, British-born Australian drummer and songwriter (Cold Chisel, Little River Band), 56
26 January – Eddie Mordue, saxophonist, 83
28 January
Raymond Cohen, violinist, 91
Dame Margaret Price, operatic soprano, 69
30 January – John Barry, British film composer, 77
31 January – Mark Ryan, guitarist (Adam and the Ants), 51
3 February – Tony Levin, jazz drummer, 71
6 February
Gary Moore, guitarist and songwriter, 58
James Watson, trumpeter, 59
14 February – George Shearing, jazz pianist, 91
27 February – Margaret Eliot, music teacher, 97
8 March – Richard Campbell, cellist, 55
15 March
Smiley Culture, reggae singer and DJ, 48 (stabbing)
Keith Fordyce, radio DJ and TV presenter, 82
17 March – J. B. Steane, music critic, 83
18 March – Jet Harris, guitarist (The Shadows), 71
20 March – Johnny Pearson, pianist, arranger and TV composer, 85
29 March – Robert Tear, operatic tenor, 72
31 March – Ishbel MacAskill, Scottish Gaelic singer and heritage campaigner, 70
25 April – Poly Styrene – singer, (X-Ray Spex), 53 (cancer)
29 April – David Mason, trumpeter, 85
7 May – Big George, arranger, 53 (heart attack)
19 May – Kathy Kirby, singer, 72
29 May – Simon Brint, musician, composer, actor and comedian (Raw Sex), 60 (suicide)
10 June – Kenny Hawkes, DJ and music producer, 42 (liver failure)
22 June
Cyril Ornadel, conductor and composer, 86
Mike Waterson, folk singer, 70
24 June – Goff Richards, English composer, 66
9 July – Würzel, guitarist, 61
14 July – Eric Delaney, percussionist and bandleader, 87
15 July – Cuddly Dudley, rock and roll singer, 87
23 July – Amy Winehouse, singer, musician, 27 (alcohol poisoning)
3 August – Andrew McDermott, singer (Threshold), 45 (kidney failure)
15 August – Betty Thatcher, lyricist, 67
10 September – Graham Collier, jazz bassist, 74
21 September – John Du Cann, guitarist (Atomic Rooster), 66
2 October – David Bedford, composer, 74
5 October – Bert Jansch, singer, musician, 67
15 October – Betty Driver, singer and actress, 91
18 October – Bob Brunning, blues musician (Fleetwood Mac), 68
21 October – Edmundo Ros, Trinidadian band leader, 100
28 October – Beryl Davis, singer, 87
29 October – Sir Jimmy Savile, DJ, 84
6 November – Gordon Beck, jazz pianist and composer, 75
24 November – Ross MacManus, trumpeter, 84
26 November – Keef Hartley, drummer and bandleader, 67
6 December – Tony Fell, music publisher, 79
12 December – John Gardner, composer, 94

See also
 2011 in British radio
 2011 in British television
 2011 in the United Kingdom
 List of British films of 2011

References

 
2011